Colby Lake is a lake in Chisago County, Minnesota, in the United States.

Colby Lake was named for an early settler.

See also
List of lakes in Minnesota

References

Lakes of Minnesota
Lakes of Chisago County, Minnesota